The Sisters of Jesus the Good Shepherd (postnominal abbreviation: S.J.B.P.), also known as the Pastorelle Sisters, is a Catholic religious order. It was founded by the Italian priest James Alberione in Italy, and formed on 7 October 1938. Members of the order, who are referred to as Pastorelle, generally carry the letters S.J.B.P. after their names, standing for Suore Jesu Buen Pastor, meaning of the Sisters of Jesus the Good Shepherd.

Provinces
The Congregation is present in Albania, Argentina, Australia, Bolivia, Brazil,  Chile, Colombia, Cuba, Gabon, Italy, Japan, Mexico, Mozambique, Peru, Philippines, Saipan, South Korea, Taiwan, United States of America, Uruguay and Venezuela. 

It has five provinces and four delegations, as follows:
Italy Central North - Mozambique Province
Italy Central South - Albania Province
Brazil St. Paul - Gabon Province
Brazil Caxias do Sul - Uruguay Province
Philippines - Australia - Saipan - Taiwan Province
Argentina - Bolivia Delegation
Chile - Peru Delegation
Colombia - Venezuela - Mexico Delegation
Korea Delegation

References

Catholic religious orders established in the 20th century
1938 establishments in Italy